Constantin "Dina" Grameni (born 23 October 2002) is a Romanian professional footballer who plays as a central midfielder for Liga I side Farul Constanța.

Club career

Viitorul Constanța
He made his league debut on 4 March 2021 in Liga I match against FC Botoșani.

Career statistics

Club

References

External links
 
 

2002 births
Living people
Sportspeople from Constanța
Romanian people of Aromanian descent
Aromanian sportspeople
Romanian footballers
Romania youth international footballers
Association football midfielders
Liga I players
FC Viitorul Constanța players
FCV Farul Constanța players